The Karplus equation, named after Martin Karplus, describes the correlation between 3J-coupling constants and dihedral torsion angles in nuclear magnetic resonance spectroscopy:

where J is the 3J coupling constant,  is the dihedral angle, and A, B, and C are empirically derived parameters whose values depend on the atoms and substituents involved. The relationship may be expressed in a variety of equivalent ways e.g. involving cos2 φ  rather than cos 2φ —these lead to different numerical values of A, B, and C but do not change the nature of the relationship.

The relationship is used for 3JH,H coupling constants.  The superscript "3" indicates that a 1H atom is coupled to another 1H atom three bonds away, via H-C-C-H bonds.  (Such hydrogens bonded to neighbouring carbon atoms are termed vicinal). The magnitude of these couplings are generally smallest when the torsion angle is close to 90° and largest at angles of 0 and 180°.

This relationship between local geometry and coupling constant is of great value throughout nuclear magnetic resonance spectroscopy and is particularly valuable for determining backbone torsion angles in protein NMR studies.

References

External links
 Generalized Karplus calculation of proton-proton coupling constants
 Karplus equations app

Nuclear magnetic resonance